Princess Katherine of Greece and Denmark (4 May 1913 – 2 October 2007), styled in the United Kingdom as Lady Katherine Brandram from 1947 until 2007, was the third daughter and youngest child of King Constantine I of Greece and Princess Sophia of Prussia.

Early life
Katherine was born on 
4 May 1913 in the Royal Palace in Athens, a few weeks after her paternal grandfather, King George I of Greece, was assassinated in Thessaloniki). She was baptised on 14 June 1913. Her godparents were Olga Constantinovna (the Dowager Queen of Greece, her paternal grandmother), Alexandra (the Dowager Queen of the United Kingdom, her paternal grandfather's sister and her maternal grandmother's sister-in-law), George V (the King of the United Kingdom, her paternal grandfather's nephew and her maternal grandmother's nephew), Wilhelm II, German Emperor (her maternal uncle), The Greek Navy (represented by the Minister of Marine) and The Greek Army (represented by the Minister of War).

Katherine had five siblings – three brothers (George, Alexander and Paul, each of whom would become King of the Hellenes) and two sisters (Princess Helen, who married Crown Prince Carol of Romania, and Princess Irene who married Prince Aimone of Savoy, Duke of Spoleto). When she was christened, the members of the whole Greek Army and Greek Navy became her godparents. At three years of age, she and her mother were trapped in Tatoi Palace, outside Athens, when a fire broke out. The Queen, carrying her, managed to escape in time.

Life in exile
Her father abdicated in 1917, replaced as king by her brother Alexander. She and her parents were exiled to Switzerland. They were re-instated following Alexander's death in 1920, but Constantine abdicated again in 1922. Exiled again, this time to Sicily, her father died in Palermo in 1923. The family moved to Villa Sparta in Florence, where Katherine took up painting. Her second brother George became King George II in 1922, but was deposed in 1924.

Katherine was educated in England, at a boarding school at Broadstairs and then North Foreland Lodge. Her mother died in January 1932, after which she continued to live at the Villa Sparta with her sister, Helen. She and the future Elizabeth II were bridesmaids at the wedding of her first cousin, Princess Marina, to Prince George in 1934.

Return to Greece and marriage
Her brother George was reinstated as king in 1935, and Katherine returned to Greece with her sister, Irene. She joined the Greek Red Cross when the Second World War broke out in 1939. In 1941, after Greece had been overrun by Axis forces, she fled to South Africa with her third brother, Paul, in a Sunderland flying boat, where she worked as a nurse at a hospital in Cape Town. She heard no news of her sister Helen for four years. She returned to England in 1946, sailing the last leg from Egypt to England on the Cunard liner RMS Ascania. On board, she met Major Richard Campbell Brandram MC (5 August 1911 – 5 April 1994), an officer in the British Royal Artillery. They were engaged three weeks after they arrived in England, but their engagement was announced only in February 1947. On 1 April at the Royal Palace, three weeks prior to the wedding, her brother King George had a stroke and died shortly after in Katherine's presence. George was succeeded on the Greek throne by Katherine's third brother Paul, who acted as best man at the wedding, which took place according to schedule on 21 April 1947.

She then accompanied her husband to his new army posting in Baghdad, and they later settled in England. On 25 August 1947, King George VI granted her the rank and title of a duke's daughter and she became known as Lady Katherine Brandram. She and her husband lived in Eaton Square in Belgravia, and later moved to Marlow, Buckinghamshire.

According to her obituary in The Daily Telegraph, "Lady Katherine lived quietly but remained in close touch with her own and the British royal families. She attended the Queen's wedding to Prince Philip (her first cousin), and was a guest at the service to mark Prince Philip's 80th birthday at St George's Chapel, Windsor, in 2001."

After the death of Infanta Beatriz of Spain in 2002, Katherine was the last surviving great-granddaughter of Queen Victoria, as well the last surviving grandchild of Frederick III, German Emperor and Victoria, Princess Royal. She lived for almost 87 years after the death of her brother, King Alexander, and her death left her second cousin Count Carl Johan Bernadotte of Sweden (31 October 1916 – 5 May 2012) as Queen Victoria's last living great-grandchild.

From the time of the death of her eldest sister Queen Helen, Queen Mother of Romania in 1982, to the time of her own death, she was Queen Victoria's most senior female line descendant. Her death marked the end of all female-line direct descendants of Frederick III, German Emperor and Victoria, Princess Royal.

Issue
Princess Katherine of Greece and Denmark and Major Richard Campbell Andrew Brandram had one child, a son:

 Richard Paul George Andrew Brandram (1 April 1948 – 9 May 2020); he married Jennifer Diane Steele on 12 February 1975 and they were divorced in 1993. They have three children and four grandchildren. He remarried Katherine Moreton on 19 September 2009. 
 Sophie Eila Brandram (23 January 1981); she married Humphrey Walter Voelcker on 11 February 2017. They have two sons.
 Maximillian Walter Voelcker (4 February 2018)
 Alexander Paul Voelcker (13 May 2019)
 Nicholas George Brandram (23 April 1982); he married Katrina Davis on 10 September 2011 and they divorced in 2014. In 2022, he married Sophie Amelia Ferguson (b. 1992). 
 Alexia Katherine Brandram (6 December 1985); she married William John Palairet Hicks on 29 April 2016. They have two children.
Theodora Katherine Anne Hicks (6 March 2019)
Frederick "Freddie" William Paul Hicks (10 April 2021)

Ancestry

References

External links

1913 births
2007 deaths
House of Glücksburg (Greece)
Refugees ennobled in the United Kingdom
Greek princesses
Danish princesses
People educated at North Foreland Lodge
Nobility from Athens
Burials at Tatoi Palace Royal Cemetery
Daughters of kings
Greek emigrants to the United Kingdom